John William Butler (September 14, 1918 – April 1963) was a professional football player in the National Football League drafted by the Pittsburgh Steelers in 1942. He would go on to play for both Steelers merged teams ("Steagles" in 1943; "Card-Pitt" in 1944). In 1943 Butler was drafted into the military due to World War II, however he was physically disqualified for duty. He then made his first start with the "Steagles" one day after being ruled 4-F by his draft board for poor eyesight and bad knees. During the 1944 season, Butler was charged, and fined $200, by co-coaches Walt Kiesling and Phil Handler for "indifferent play". He was then put on waivers and was soon claimed by the Brooklyn Tigers. In 1945, he played his final season with the Philadelphia Eagles.

Prior to playing professionally, Butler played football at the college level while attending the University of Tennessee from 1939–1941. As a sophomore in 1939, Bulter ran 56 yards for a touchdown against the University of Alabama.  He was elected into the Tennessee Sports Hall of Fame in 1997.

Notes

Steagles: When the Steelers and Eagles were One in the Same
Tennessee Sports Hall of Fame
Tennessee Football History
John Butler's NFL profile
Johnny Butler's obituary

1918 births
1963 deaths
Players of American football from Tennessee
Tennessee Volunteers football players
Brooklyn Tigers players
Card-Pitt players
Philadelphia Eagles players
Steagles players and personnel